Eastern European identity is the objective or subjective state of perceiving oneself as an Eastern European person and as relating to being Eastern European.

Background
The identity has been referenced in media, and researched widely in academia and across international institutions in relation to both domestic and diasporic Eastern European identity. In a research study by four professors and doctors of University of Exeter,  the academics proposed that the identity has historical roots associated with early Muslim conquests in the region and a subsequent early conception of "Fortress Europe":

Alongside Iberia, parts of Eastern Europe had the longest engagement with the Islamic world on the continent. Through the presence of domestic Muslim minorities and entanglement with the Ottoman Empire for over half a millennium, the idea of Islam - whether in times of conflict or of coexistence - played a formative role in the construction of a specifically Eastern European identity.

University of Graz academic Natalia Waechter's research has correlated a pattern of a lesser sense of the identity in individuals who, while European, are ethnic minorities in neighboring countries in the region; "Analysis has also shown that Eastern European identity is especially low for ethnic minority groups among which either Slovakia or Hungary is resident nation or titular nation (Slovaks in Hungary, Hungarians in Slovakia, and Hungarians in Ukraine)." In Integrative Psychological and Behavioral Science, the competing national (e.g. Moldovan) versus regional Eastern European identity in diasporic populations has also been explored within the United Kingdom.

History
In an Anthropological Journal of European Cultures-piece, University of Exeter's Dr Ljubica Spaskovska proposed that an "East-West divide" in Europe and a "distinct 'Eastern European' identity" can be traced and credited to several European project developments between the two World Wars. At the end of the Cold War and the revolutions of 1989, Eastern European identity entered a new phase of development. In this regard, sociologist Göran Therborn believes "heavy-handed Soviet bilateral hegemony barred most of any positive Eastern European identity".

In 2000, Iulia Motoc, who in 2013 became a European Court of Human Rights judge, published research suggesting that the development of the identity can be contrasted with German identity. In the context of European integration within the legal structure of the European Union, while both identities "demonstrate a deep attachment to Europe", Motoc proposed that national identity in Germany shows signs of subsiding, while contrastingly a growing assertion of Eastern European identity has been observed. Since the 2004 enlargement of the European Union, academic analysis has suggested that cooperation between MEPs from the EU8 countries can be viewed as the expression of "Central and Eastern European identity".

In Costica Bradatan's 2013 Philosophy, Society and the Cunning of History in Eastern Europe, academic Julia Sushytska analyzed Lviv, a city in Eastern Europe which had its national affiliation switched seven times in the 20th-century, as an example of the complexities in Eastern European identity formation and associations.

Academic research
Research by academic Gary Marks and political scientist Liesbet Hooghe has correlated strong national identity in Eastern Europe with both a pan-European and broad Eastern European identity. In 2009, University of Helsinki's Matti Jutilla analyzed historian Hans Kohn's dichotomy on Eastern versus Western European identity.

Published in the European Journal of International Relations, the research proposed conflict and bias in Kohn's representations of the two regional European identities; with common portrayals of Eastern European identity as backward or illiberal in comparison to its Western counterpart. In 2013's The Politics of Becoming European, University of Kent academic Maria Mälksoo used the writings of Russian philosopher Mikhail Bakhtin to analyze and compare "Western and Eastern European identity constructions". In June 2019, Dr Catherine Baker of the University of Hull, University of Warsaw's Agnieszka Kościańska, and Dr Bogdan Iacob and professor James Mark at University of Exeter spoke at a conference in Bucharest which attempted to explore the identity's complex intersection with whiteness and the Western world.

See also

Notes

References

Eastern European culture
Eastern European diaspora
Eastern European people